The 1965–66 IHL season was the 21st season of the International Hockey League, a North American minor professional league. Six teams participated in the regular season, and the Port Huron Flags won the Turner Cup.

Regular season

Turner Cup-Playoffs

External links
 Season 1965/66 on hockeydb.com

IHL
International Hockey League (1945–2001) seasons